Luvuyo Phindile "PaPi" Pupuma (born ) is a South African rugby union player for the  in the Currie Cup and in the Rugby Challenge. He usually plays as a prop.

Rugby career

Early years

Pupuma was born and grew up in Johannesburg. He attended St Benedict's College in Bedfordview, matriculating in 2011 alongside fellow future professional rugby player, Luther Obi.

After high school, Pupuma studied at the University of the Witwatersrand, and he also played rugby for their senior team in the Varsity Cup in 2013, 2014 and 2017 and in the Varsity Shield in 2015 and 2016. He came into a  team that were promoted as champions from the Varsity Shield in 2012 to make their Varsity Cup debut in 2013. They lost all their games at the higher level in 2013 and 2014 and were relegated to the second-tier level for 2015. He had a stand-out season in that competition, helping Wits to their best-ever finish of fifth, and being named in the Varsity Cup Dream Team at the conclusion of the series, appearing as a replacement in their 19–50 defeat to the South Africa Under-20 team.

Golden Lions

Pupuma made his first class debut on 7 May 2016, coming on as a 30th-minute replacement in the 's Currie Cup qualification match against  in Randburg. He made one more appearance in the competition, also as a replacement against in their match against .

He was also included in their squad for the 2017 Currie Cup Premier Division, but failed to make any appearances in the competition.

Southern Kings

Pupuma was included in the Southern Kings squad for their inaugural season in the Pro14 competition. He made his debut for the Kings in a 10–57 defeat to Welsh side Scarlets in their opening match of the competition, coming on as a second-half replacement, and again appeared as a replacement in their second match, scoring a late try in a 10–32 defeat to Connacht in Galway.

References

South African rugby union players
Living people
1992 births
Rugby union players from Johannesburg
Rugby union props
Golden Lions players
Southern Kings players
Eastern Province Elephants players
Ampthill RUFC players